Neu-Baumburg Castle (also Neu-Bamberg, Neuenbaumburg, Novobeimburg and Neubamberg) is a ruined castle in the town of Neu-Bamberg in Rhineland-Palatinate, Germany.

Notes and references

Sources and external links
www.burgeninventar.de in German only.

Castles in Rhineland-Palatinate
Ruined castles in Germany